We the Animals is a 2018 American coming-of-age drama film, directed by Jeremiah Zagar and written by Zagar and Dan Kitrosser, based on the novel of the same name by Justin Torres. The film marks Zagar's first narrative feature film. The film stars Evan Rosado, Raúl Castillo, Sheila Vand, Isaiah Kristian, and Josiah Gabriel. It premiered at the 2018 Sundance Film Festival and was released on August 17, 2018, by The Orchard.

Premise 
Jonah grows up with rambunctious brothers in a working class mixed-race family in upstate New York and must contend with both his volatile father and his emerging homosexuality.

Production 

The film was shot on grainy 16mm film and includes colored pencil animated sequences. The cinematographer, Zak Mulligan, said "there was a lot of effort to create [a] feeling of intimacy" and noted that much of the film was shot at child's-eye-height. The actors who played the brothers and parents lived together during production so they would feel like a real family. The director, Jeremiah Zagar, involved the novel's author Justin Torres throughout the process, saying Torres "was on the set, and he read every draft of the script...He was even in the editing room". The film was dedicated to the memory of Tim Hetherington.

Cast 
 Evan Rosado as Jonah
 Raúl Castillo as Paps
 Sheila Vand as Ma
 Isaiah Kristian as Manny
 Josiah Gabriel as Joel
 Giovanni Pacciarelli as Dustin
 Moe Isaac as Dustin's Grandpa
 Michael Pemberton as Foreman George
 Mickey Anthony as Clerk Kevin
 Amelia Campbell as Woman in Van
 Tom Malley as Old Man
 Terry Holland as Televangelist Voice

Reception 
Critics compared the film to Moonlight and Tree of Life and variously called it impressionistic, intimate, woozy, and evocative. The website's critical consensus reads, "Dreamlike and haunting, We the Animals approaches the coming-of-age odyssey with a uniquely documentarian eye." On Metacritic, which assigns a rating to reviews, the film has a weighted average score of 83 out of 100, based on 25 critics, indicating "universal acclaim". The film won the Sundance NEXT Innovator Award and was nominated for five 2019 Independent Spirit Awards.

References

External links 
 
 
 
 

2018 films
2010s coming-of-age drama films
2018 independent films
2018 LGBT-related films
American independent films
Hispanic and Latino American LGBT-related films
American coming-of-age drama films
Films based on American novels
Hispanic and Latino American drama films
LGBT-related drama films
LGBT-related coming-of-age films
American films with live action and animation
Gay-related films
2018 drama films
Films set in New York (state)
Films about brothers
Films about domestic violence
Films shot in 16 mm film
2010s English-language films
Films directed by Jeremiah Zagar
2010s American films